The 2015–16 Idaho State Bengals women's basketball team represented Idaho State University during the 2015–16 NCAA Division I women's basketball season. The Bengals, led by eighth year head coach Seton Sobolewski, played their home games at Reed Gym. They were members of the Big Sky Conference. They finished the season 18–15, 8–10 in Big Sky play to finish in a tie for eighth place. They advanced to the championship game of the Big Sky women's tournament where they lost to their in-state rival Idaho.

Roster

Schedule

|-
!colspan=9 style="background:#000000; color:#FF8300;"| Exhibition

|-
!colspan=9 style="background:#000000; color:#FF8300;"| Non-conference regular season

|-
!colspan=9 style="background:#000000; color:#FF8300;"| Big Sky regular season

|-
!colspan=9 style="background:#000000; color:#FF8300;"| Big Sky Women's Tournament

See also
2015–16 Idaho State Bengals men's basketball team

References

Idaho State Bengals women's basketball seasons
Idaho State